Mark Shepherd may refer to:
Mark Shepherd (businessman) (1923–2009), chairman and CEO of Texas Instruments
Mark Allen Shepherd (born 1961), actor best known for role as Morn on Deep Space Nine
Mark Shepherd (novelist) (1961–2011), author of several fantasy novels, such as Elvendude and Spiritride
Mark R. Shepherd (1953–2011), American environmental consultant, politician, strategist and radio personality
Mark Shepherd (lacrosse) (born 1978), Canadian professional lacrosse player

See also
Mark Shepard (born 1960), Vermont State Senator (R - Bennington County) and former U.S. House candidate
Mark Sheppard (born 1964), British actor and musician